Opatkowiczki  is a village in the administrative district of Gmina Czarnocin, within Kazimierza County, Świętokrzyskie Voivodeship, in south-central Poland. As of 2011, the village had 70 males and 83 females, for a total population of 153 people.

References

Opatkowiczki